Barysomus is a genus of beetles in the family Carabidae, containing the following species:

 Barysomus argentinus Lutshnik, 1934
 Barysomus cayennensis Laporte de Castelnau, 1832
 Barysomus cephalotes Erichson, 1848
 Barysomus hoepfneri Dejean, 1829
 Barysomus metallicus Reiche, 1843
 Barysomus punctatostriatus Emden, 1949

References

Harpalinae